Ofe Oha is a soup mostly eaten in the south eastern part of Nigeria.

Oha soup is a Nigerian delicacy from the Eastern region, it is commonly prepared by the Igbo people from an evergreen tree whose botanical name is Pterocarpus mildraedii.

The main ingredient for the soup is the oha leaf, others include uziza,achi (soup thickener), meat, crayfish ,palm oil and salt.Other namesmes for Oha soup include uha and ora soup.

Other foods 
Oha/Uha soup is best taken with fufu. Pounded yam, semolina, wheat  and Eba also goes well with the soup.

Gallery

References 

Igbo cuisine